Xiaduwu Township (Mandarin: 下大武乡) is a township in Maqên County, Golog Tibetan Autonomous Prefecture, Qinghai, China. In 2010, Xiaduwu Township had a total population of 1,663 people: 856 males and 807 females: 433 under 14 years old, 1,121 aged between 15 and 64 and 109 over 65 years old.

References 

Township-level divisions of Qinghai
Golog Tibetan Autonomous Prefecture